One-upmanship, also called "one-upsmanship", is the art or practice of successively outdoing a competitor. The term was first used in the title of a book by Stephen Potter, published in 1952 as a follow-up to The Theory and Practice of Gamesmanship (or the Art of Winning Games without Actually Cheating) (1947), and Lifemanship titles in his series of tongue-in-cheek self-help books, and film and television derivatives, that teach various ploys to achieve this. This comic satire of self-help style guides manipulates traditional British conventions for the gamester, all life being a game, who understands that if you're not one-up, you're one-down. Potter's unprincipled principles apply to almost any possession, experience or situation, deriving maximum undeserved rewards and discomfitting the opposition. The 1960 film School for Scoundrels and its 2006 remake were satiric portrayals of how to use Potter's ideas. 

In that context, the term refers to a satiric course in the gambits required for the systematic and conscious practice of "creative intimidation", making one's associates feel inferior and thereby gaining the status of being "one-up" on them. Viewed seriously, it is a phenomenon of group dynamics that can have significant effects in the management field: for instance, manifesting in office politics.

See also
 Arms race
 Competition
 The Dozens
 Gaming the system
 Mind games
 Opportunism
 Winning streak

References

External links

 

Competition
Group processes
Ethically disputed practices